Touchay is a commune in the Cher department in the Centre-Val de Loire region of France.

Geography

Population

Sights
 The church of St. Martin, dating from the fifteenth century.
 The fifteenth-century manorhouse de l’Asnerie.
 The fifteenth-century chateau of l'Isle-sur-Arnon.

Personalities
Maurice Utrillo, artist, lived here and created a painting of the village square.

See also
Communes of the Cher department

References

External links

Annuaire Mairie website 

Communes of Cher (department)